Sermersooq is a municipality in Greenland, formed on 1 January 2009 from five earlier, smaller municipalities. Its administrative seat is the city of Nuuk (formerly called Godthåb), the capital of Greenland, and it is the most populous municipality in the country, with 23,123 inhabitants as of January 2020.

Creation
The municipality consists of former municipalities of eastern and southwestern Greenland, each named after the largest settlement at the time of formation:

 Ammassalik Municipality
 Ittoqqortoormiit Municipality
 Ivittuut Municipality
 Nuuk Municipality
 Paamiut Municipality

Administrative divisions

Ammassalik area
 Tasiilaq (Ammassalik)
 Kuummiit
 Kulusuk (Kap Dan)
 Tiniteqilaaq
 Sermiligaaq
 Isortoq

Ittoqqortoormiit area
 Ittoqqortoormiit (Scoresbysund)
 Itterajivit

Ivittuut area
 Kangilinnguit (Grønnedal)

Nuuk area
 Nuuk (Godthåb)
 Kapisillit
 Qeqertarsuatsiaat (Fiskenæsset)

Paamiut area
 Paamiut (Frederikshåb)
 Arsuk

Geography 
As of 2018, it is the largest municipality in the world by area, following the split of the former Qaasuitsup. As of January 2013 its population was 17,498. In the south, it is flanked by the Kujalleq municipality, with the border running alongside Alanngorsuaq Fjord. The waters flowing around the western coastline of the municipality are that of Labrador Sea, which to the north narrows down to form Davis Strait separating the island of Greenland from Baffin Island.

In the northwest, the municipality is bordered by the Qeqqata municipality, and further north by the Qeqertalik and Avannaata municipalities. The latter two borders however run north–south through the center (45° West meridian) of the Greenland ice sheet − and as such are free of traffic. In the north the municipality is bordered by the Northeast Greenland National Park beyond Cape Biot, at the northern end of Fleming Fjord. In the east, near the settlement of Ittoqqortoormiit, the municipal shores straddle the Kangertittivaq fjord, which opens to the cold Greenland Sea. The southeastern shores are bordered by the Anorituup Kangerlua fjord of the Irminger Sea in the North Atlantic Ocean.

Politics
Sermersooq's municipal council consists of 19 members, elected every four years.

Municipal council

Transport 
Sermersooq is one of two municipalities straddling the western and eastern sides of the island, but is the only municipality where settlements on both coasts are connected via scheduled flights from Nuuk Airport to Kulusuk Airport and Nerlerit Inaat Airport and reverse, operated year-round by Air Greenland. There are also local flights between Nuuk and Paamiut Airport on the west coast.

Language 

Kalaallisut, the West Greenlandic dialect is spoken in the towns and settlements of the western coast. Danish is also in use in the bigger towns. Tunumiit oraasiat, the East Greenlandic dialect, is spoken on the eastern coast.

See also 
 KANUKOKA

References 

 
Municipalities of Greenland
Populated places established in 2009